Around the World in Eighty Days is a novel by Jules Verne.

Around the World in Eighty Days may also refer to:

Film 
 Around the World in Eighty Days (1919 film), a 1919 German silent adventure comedy film
Around the World in 80 Days (1956 film), an adaptation starring David Niven
Around the World in 80 Days (1988 film), an Australian animated adaptation
Around the World in 80 Days (2004 film), an adaptation starring Jackie Chan and Steve Coogan
Around the World in 80 Days (2021 film), a French animated adaptation

Television 
Around the World in 80 Days with Michael Palin, a 1989 UK travel TV series made by the BBC
Around the World in Eighty Days (1972 TV series), a one-season Australian animated television adaptation
Around the World in 80 Days (miniseries), a 1989 adaptation starring Pierce Brosnan
Around the World in 80 Days (2009 TV series), a UK reality TV series
Around the World in 80 Days (2021 TV series), a period adventure television drama series

Other uses 
Around the World in 80 Days (Alton Towers), an amusement ride
"Around the World in Eighty Days," a 1989 song by British indie pop band Brighter
Around the World in 80 Days (Palin book), a 1989 companion to the TV series
Around the World in 80 Days (video game), a video game based on the 2004 movie
 Around the World in 80 Days (board game), a 2004 designer board game

See also
 80 Days (disambiguation)
 Around the World (disambiguation)
 Around the Day in Eighty Worlds, a 1967 book by Julio Cortázar
 Around the World in 20 Years, a 2008 TV documentary starring Michael Palin
 Around the World in a Day, a 1985 album by Prince
 Around the World in Eighteen Days, a 1923 film serial
 Around the World in 80 Ways (2011), an American reality TV show
 Around the World in 80 Ways, a 1988 Australian film
 Around the World with Willy Fog, a 1984 Spanish animated adaptation of Verne's novel